The Bibliothèque municipale de Grenoble is a library in Grenoble, France.
It was founded in 1772, following the succession of Bishop, Jean de Caulet.

The current building located Boulevard Maréchal Lyautey was opened in January 1960 for the University and since 1970, for all audiences.

References

External links 
 Official website (English)

Public libraries in France
Libraries in Auvergne-Rhône-Alpes
Educational institutions in Grenoble
Library buildings completed in 1960
Libraries established in 1772